Orange County is a county located in the U.S. state of New York. As of the 2020 census, the population was 401,310. The county seat is Goshen. This county was first created in 1683 and reorganized with its present boundaries in 1798.

Orange County is part of the Poughkeepsie–Newburgh–Middletown metropolitan statistical area, which belongs to the larger New York–Newark–Bridgeport, NY–NJ–CT–PA Combined Statistical Area. It is in the state's Mid-Hudson Region of the Hudson Valley Area.

History
Orange County was officially established on November 1, 1683, when the Province of New York was divided into twelve counties. Each of these was named to honor a member of the British royal family, and Orange County took its name from the Prince of Orange, who subsequently became King William III of England. As originally defined, Orange County included only the southern part of its present-day territory, plus all of present-day Rockland County further south. The northern part of the present-day county, beyond Moodna Creek, was then a part of neighbouring Ulster County.

At that date, the only European inhabitants of the area were a handful of Dutch colonists in present-day Rockland County, and the area of modern Orange County was entirely occupied by the native Munsee people. Due to its relatively small population, the original Orange County was not fully independent and was administered by New York County.

The first European settlers in the area of the present-day county arrived in 1685. They were a party of around twenty-five families from Scotland, led by David Toshach, the Laird of Monzievaird, and his brother-in-law Major Patrick McGregor, a former officer of the French Army. They settled in the Hudson Highlands at the place where the Moodna Creek enters the Hudson River, now known as New Windsor. In 1709, a group of German Palatine refugees settled at Newburgh. They were Protestants from a part of Germany along the Rhine that had suffered during the religious wars. Queen Anne's government arranged for passage from England of nearly 3,000 Palatines in ten ships. Many were settled along the Hudson River in work camps on property belonging to Robert Livingston. In 1712, a 16-year-old indentured servant named Sarah Wells from Manhattan led a small party of three Munsee men and three hired carpenters into the undeveloped interior of the county and created the first settlement in the Town of Goshen on the Otter Kill. She was falsely promised by her master Christopher Denne 100 acres bounty for taking on the dangerous mission to make a land claim for him. He never gave her the land. But, she did fall in love and married Irish immigrant William Bull there in 1718 and they had 12 children and built the Bull Stone House. In 1716, the first known Black woman resident was recorded in Orange County. Her name was Mercy and she was enslaved by Christopher Denne at his settlement on the Otter Kill. Additional immigrants came from Ireland; they were of Scots and English descent who had been settled as planters there.

During the American Revolutionary War the county was divided into Loyalists, Patriots, and those who remained neutral. The local government supported the Revolution, or "The Cause." Some residents posed as Loyalists but were part of a secret spy network set up by Gen. George Washington. Capt. William Bull III of the Town of Wallkill (which was then a part of Ulster County) served in the Continental Army with Gen. Washington in Spencer's Additional Continental Regiment. His cousin was revealed after the war to be part of Washington's spy ring. His brother Moses Bull raised 20 men from the Town of Wallkill to service with his brother. Capt. Bull was promoted twice for valor on the battlefield, once in the Battle of Monmouth where he was part of Lord Stirling's men who famously saved the day after Gen. Lee's retreat. Capt. Bull wintered at Valley Forge with several men from Orange County. Capt. Bull retired from the Army in 1781 and returned to the Town of Wallkill where he built Brick Castle. Hundreds of men from Orange County served in the local militia and many of them fought in the Battle of Fort Montgomery and Fort Clinton. However, many residents remained loyal to King George III, include members of Capt. Bull's family. Many in the county were divided within families. Capt. Bull's uncle Thomas Bull was jailed for years in Goshen and then Fishkill for being a Loyalist. Resident Claudius Smith was a Loyalist marauder whose team robbed and terrorized citizens; he was hanged in Goshen in 1779 for allegedly robbing and killing Major Nathaniel Strong; two of his sons were also executed for similar crimes. Capt. Bull's cousin Peter Bull of Hamptonburgh served in the Orange County regiment and was charged with guarding the roads at night from Smith. The Mathews family of Blooming Grove were active Loyalists; Fletcher Mathews was a sympathizer and sometime associate of Smith, and his brother David Mathews was Mayor of New York City during its British occupation for the entirety of the war.

In 1798, after the American Revolutionary War, the boundaries of Orange County changed. Its southern corner was used to create the new Rockland County, and in exchange, an area to the north of the Moodna Creek was added, which had previously been in Ulster County. This caused a reorganization of the local administration, as the original county seat had been fixed at Orangetown in 1703, but this was now in Rockland County. Duties were subsequently shared between Goshen, which had been the center of government for the northern part of Orange County, and Newburgh, which played a similar role in the area transferred from Ulster County. The county court was established in 1801.  It was not until 1970 that Goshen was named as the sole county seat.

Due to a boundary dispute between New York and New Jersey, the boundaries of many of the southern towns of the county were not definitively established until the 19th century.

Geography

Orange County is in southeastern New York State, directly north of the New Jersey-New York border, west of the Hudson River, east of the Delaware River and northwest of New York City. It borders the New York counties of Dutchess, Putnam, Rockland, Sullivan, Ulster, and Westchester, as well as Passaic and Sussex counties in New Jersey and Pike County in Pennsylvania.

Orange County is the only county which borders both the Hudson and Delaware Rivers, and is also the only county in the state to border both New Jersey (south) and Pennsylvania (west).

Orange County is where the Great Valley of the Appalachians finally opens up and ends. The western corner is set off by the Shawangunk Ridge. The area along the Rockland County border (within Harriman and Bear Mountain state parks) and south of Newburgh is part of the Hudson Highlands. The land in between is the valley of the Wallkill River. In the southern portion of the county the Wallkill valley expands into a wide glacial lake bed known as the Black Dirt Region for its fertility.

The lowest is sea level along the Hudson.

National protected areas
 Upper Delaware Scenic and Recreational River (part)
 Wallkill River National Wildlife Refuge (part)

Adjacent counties
 Dutchess County – northeast
 Passaic County, New Jersey - southeast
 Pike County, Pennsylvania – southwest
 Putnam County - east
 Rockland County – southeast
 Sullivan County – northwest
 Sussex County, New Jersey - south
 Ulster County – north

Demographics

2000-2010 
At the 2010 United States Census, there were 372,813 people living in the county. The racial makeup of the county was 77.2% White, 10.2% Black or African American, 0.5% Native American, 2.4% Asian, and 3.1% from two or more races. 18% of the population were Hispanic or Latino of any race. According to the 2000 United States Census, 18.3% were of Italian, 18.1% English, 17.4% Irish, 10.2% German, and 5.0% Polish ancestry. According to the 2009–13 American Community Survey, 76.57% of people spoke only English at home, 13.39% spoke Spanish, 4.03% spoke Yiddish, and 0.83% spoke Italian.

During the 2000 Census, there were 114,788 households, out of which 39.60% had children under the age of 18 living with them, 57.90% were married couples living together, 11.40% had a female householder with no husband present, and 26.40% were non-families. 21.50% of all households were made up of individuals, and 8.50% had someone living alone who was 65 years of age or older. The average household size was 2.85 and the average family size was 3.35.

In the county, the population was spread out, with 29.00% under the age of 18, 8.70% from 18 to 24, 30.00% from 25 to 44, 21.90% from 45 to 64, and 10.30% who were 65 years of age or older. The median age was 35 years. For every 100 females, there were 100.30 males. For every 100 females age 18 and over, there were 97.50 males.

The median income for a household in the county was $52,058, and the median income for a family was $60,355. Males had a median income of $42,363 versus $30,821 for females. The per capita income for the county was $21,597. About 7.60% of families and 10.50% of the population were below the poverty line, including 14.80% of those under age 18 and 8.00% of those age 65 or over.

Despite its rural roots, Orange County has been among the fastest-growing regions within the New York City metropolitan area.

2018 
Per the American Community Survey's 2018 estimates, there were 381,951 residents within Orange County. 63.5% of the county was non-Hispanic white, 12.95 Black or African American, 0.8% Native American, 2.9% Asian, 0.1% Pacific Islander, 3.0% from two or more races, and 21.0% Hispanic or Latino of any race. 24.4% of Orange County's residents spoke another language other than English at home.

There were 126,776 households in 2018 and an average of 2.90 persons per household. The owner-occupied housing rate was 68.0% and the median gross rent of the county was $1,223. The median homeowner cost with a mortgage was $2,280 and $909 without a mortgage.

The median income for a household from 2014 to 2018 was $76,716 and the per capita income was $33,472. 11.5% of the county's inhabitants were below the poverty line in 2018.

2020 Census

Law and government

Originally, like most New York counties, Orange County was governed by a board of supervisors. Its board consisted of the 20 town supervisors, nine city supervisors elected from the nine wards of the City of Newburgh, and four each elected from the wards of the cities of Middletown and Port Jervis. In 1968, the board adopted a county charter and a reapportionment plan that created the county legislature and executive. The first county executive and legislature were elected in November, 1969 and took office on January 1, 1970. Today, Orange County is still governed by the same charter; residents elect the county executive and a 21-member county legislature elected from 21 single-member districts. There are also several state constitutional positions that are elected, including a sheriff, county clerk and district attorney. Prior to 1 January 2008 four coroners were also elected; however, on that date, the county switched to a medical examiner system.

The current county officers are:
 County Executive: Steven M. Neuhaus (Republican)
 County Clerk: Kelly A. Eskew (Republican)
 Sheriff: Paul Arteta (Republican)
 District Attorney: David M. Hoovler (Republican)

The County Legislature and its previous board of supervisors were long dominated by the Republican Party. However, since the late 20th century, the Democrats have closed the gap. During 2008 and 2009 the legislature was evenly split between 10 Republicans, 10 Democrats, and 1 Independence Party member. In 2009, the legislature had its first Democratic chairman elected when one member of the Republican caucus voted alongside the 10 Democratic members to elect Roxanne Donnery (D-Highlands/Woodbury) to the post. At the November 2009 election, several Democratic incumbents were defeated. As of the convening of the legislature on January 1, 2022, there are 14 Republicans, 6 Democrats, and 1 Independence member.

In 1970, the county switched from government by a Board of Supervisors, consisting of the elected heads of town governments, to having a 21-member elected county legislature and executive. The sheriff, district attorney and county clerk have always been elected. All serve four-year terms, with elections in the year following presidential election years, save the sheriff, whose election is the following year.

The current county executive is Steven Neuhaus, former town supervisor for Chester. David M. Hoovler, Kelly A. Eskew and Carl DuBois are the incumbent district attorney, clerk and sheriff respectively. All are Republicans.

Only one Democrat, Mary McPhillips, has served as county executive. She failed to win re-election after a single term in the early 1990s. For several years in the late 2000s, one Republican legislator's decision to become an independent and caucus with the Democrats led to a 10-10-1 effective Democratic majority, with Roxanne Donnery as chair. The Republicans regained their majority in the 2009 elections.

Transportation

The county is served by Stewart International Airport, located two miles west of Newburgh, New York. The airport serves American Airlines, Delta Air Lines, Allegiant Air, and JetBlue Airways. AirTran Airways stopped providing service to the airport in late 2008.

Ground transportation within Orange County is provided primarily by Leprechaun Lines, Monsey Trails, NJ Transit, Short Line Bus, and Metro-North Railroad's Port Jervis Line, as well as amenities such as senior citizen busing and car services, which usually restrict themselves to their respective town or city.

Major roadways 
Major routes in Orange County are freeways Interstate 84, Interstate 87, State Route 17 (Future Interstate 86), and the Palisades Interstate Parkway, and surface roads U.S. Route 6, U.S. Route 9W, and U.S. Route 209. There are two Hudson River crossings in Orange County: the Bear Mountain Bridge and the Newburgh-Beacon Bridge.

Politics

|}

In recent years, Orange County has emerged as a swing county, mirroring the preferences of the nation as a whole in presidential elections, voting for the winner in every election from 1996 to 2016. The streak ended in 2020, however, as Orange County narrowly voted to re-elect Donald Trump, even as Democratic nominee Joe Biden of Delaware won the election overall.

Bill Clinton won Orange County 48% to 42% in 1996. George W. Bush won 47% of the Orange County vote in 2000, and 54% in 2004. Barack Obama carried the county with a 51% vote share four years later and carried the county again in 2012. However, Donald Trump won the county in 2016, thus making it one of 206 counties across the country to vote for Obama twice and then Trump. In 2020, Trump again won Orange County, this time by just 312 votes out of nearly 170,000 votes cast, a margin of about 0.2 percentage points. Despite this, it was only the fourth-closest county in the state and one of five that Trump won by less than 500 votes.

Previously, like most of the Lower Hudson, Orange County had leaned Republican. From 1884 to 1992, a Republican carried Orange County at all but one presidential election. The only time this tradition was broken was in 1964, during Democrat Lyndon Johnson's 44-state landslide. As a measure of how Republican the county was, Franklin Roosevelt, a resident of nearby Dutchess County, failed to carry Orange County in any of his four successful presidential bids.

The presidential election results give the county a Cook PVI of R+1, consistent with county voters' willingness to sometimes elect Democrats, such as U.S. Rep. John Hall. From 2007 on, when Hall represented the 19th district, which covered most of the county, Orange's representation in Congress was exclusively Democratic, as Maurice Hinchey had represented the towns of Crawford, Montgomery, and Newburgh as well as the city of Newburgh, all of which were in what was then the 22nd district, since 1988.

In the 2010 midterms, Hall was defeated by Nan Hayworth. In 2012, after Hinchey's former 22nd district was eliminated in redistricting following his retirement and all of Orange County was included in the current 18th district. Hayworth was defeated by Democrat Sean Patrick Maloney, a former adviser to President Bill Clinton and the first openly gay person to be elected to Congress from New York. Maloney won a rematch against Hayworth in 2014; in 2016 he was again re-elected over Phil Oliva, and in 2018, despite running in the Democratic primary for New York Attorney General, he won re-election again over James O'Donnell.

At the state level, Republicans had held onto Senate seats (until 2018), when John Bonacic retired after 26 years, and the 42nd district, was won by Democrat Jen Metzger for 1 term, returning to GOP Mike Martucci in 2020. State Senate districts—the 39th, is held by Democrat James Skoufis since 2016. Democrats have also made significant gains in the county's State Assembly seats. The 98th district, which includes the far western part of the county as well as the Town of Warwick, is represented by Karl Brabenec, and the 101st district, which includes the Towns of Crawford and Montgomery, was until 2016 held by Claudia Tenney, both Republicans. After Tenney left her seat to run for Congress that year, Brian D. Miller, another Republican, was elected to replace her. Colin Schmitt represents the 99th district, while the other two are Democrats: Aileen Gunther in the 100th district (Middletown) and Jonathan Jacobson in the 104th district (Newburgh).

Sports
Delano-Hitch Stadium in Newburgh has played host to various professional and amateur baseball teams from various leagues since opening in 1926. The stadium is currently home to the Newburgh Newts.

High school sports
High schools in Orange County compete in Section 9 of the New York State Public High School Athletic Association along with schools from Dutchess, Ulster, and Sullivan counties.

College sports
The Army Black Knights of the United States Military Academy in West Point field NCAA Division I teams in 24 different sports. Mount Saint Mary College in Newburgh fields 15 teams in the Eastern College Athletic Conference and the Skyline Conference of NCAA Division III. Orange County Community College Colts in Middletown compete in the National Junior College Athletic Association.

Communities

Cities
 Middletown
 Newburgh
 Port Jervis

Towns

 Blooming Grove
 Chester
 Cornwall
 Crawford
 Deerpark
 Goshen
 Greenville
 Hamptonburgh
 Highlands
 Minisink
 Monroe
 Montgomery
 Mount Hope
 New Windsor
 Newburgh
 Palm Tree
 Tuxedo
 Wallkill
 Warwick
 Wawayanda
 Woodbury

Villages

 Chester
 Cornwall on Hudson
 Florida
 Goshen (county seat)
 Greenwood Lake
 Harriman
 Highland Falls
 Kiryas Joel
 Maybrook
 Monroe
 Montgomery
 Otisville
 South Blooming Grove
 Tuxedo Park
 Unionville
 Walden
 Warwick
 Washingtonville
 Woodbury

Census-designated places

 Balmville
 Beaver Dam Lake
 Firthcliffe
 Fort Montgomery
 Gardnertown
 Mechanicstown
 Mountain Lodge Park
 New Windsor
 Orange Lake
 Pine Bush
 Salisbury Mills
 Scotchtown
 Sparrow Bush
 Vails Gate
 Walton Park
 Washington Heights
 West Point

Hamlets

 Amity
 Arden
 Bellvale
 Bullville
 Carpenter's Point
 Central Valley
 Circleville
 Cuddebackville
 Highland Mills
 Howells
 Huguenot
 Little Britain
 Michigan Corners
 Mountainville
 New Hampton
 Pine Island
 Ridgebury
 Slate Hill
 Sugar Loaf
 Thompson Ridge
 Westbrookville

Education
School districts include:

 Chester Union Free School District
 Cornwall Central School District
 Eldred Central School District
 Florida Union Free School District
 Goshen Central School District
 Greenwood Lake Union Free School District
 Haverstraw-Stony Point Central School District (North Rockland)
 Highland Falls Central School District
 Kiryas Joel Village Union Free School District
 Marlboro Central School District
 Middletown City School District
 Minisink Valley Central School District
 Monroe-Woodbury Central School District
 Newburgh City School District
 Pine Bush Central School District
 Port Jervis City School District
 Suffern Central School District
 Tuxedo Union Free School District
 Valley Central School District (Montgomery)
 Wallkill Central School District
 Warwick Valley Central School District
 Washingtonville Central School District

In popular culture
 Heavy: parts of the movie were filmed in the Laurel Grove Cemetery in Port Jervis
 Super Troopers: parts of the movie were filmed in the Newburgh area.
 The Sopranos parts of season 6-b, Episode 1: Warwick and Tuxedo
 Michael Clayton: Moodna Viaduct (Cornwall), South Blooming Grove, and Stewart Airport (New Windsor/Newburgh area)
 The Human Footprint: parts filmed in the Hudson Valley region; aired on National Geographic Channel in 2008
 American Chopper: Montgomery, NY
 Final Destination & Final Destination 2: Parts of plot takes place in Otisville, NY and Greenwood Lake, NY - Shown by patches that police officers wear and television news program that is played.
 The OA: Partially filmed in Central Valley, NY

Points of interest
Points of interest in Orange County include the United States Military Academy at West Point; Brotherhood Winery, America's oldest winery, in Washingtonville; the birthplace of William H. Seward in Florida; the home and birthplace of Velveeta and Liederkranz Cheese in Monroe; the Harness Racing Museum & Hall of Fame in Goshen; Bull Stone House, built in 1722 and still used as a residence (10 generations) by the same family who built it. the Times Herald-Record newspaper, the first cold press offset daily in the country, in Middletown; the Galleria at Crystal Run, in Wallkill; the Woodbury Common Premium Outlets in Monroe; and the Orange County Fair in Wallkill. The only state parks include Goosepond Mountain State Park, Harriman State Park and Sterling Forest State Park. Museum Village in Monroe. It is also the location of Orange County Choppers, the custom motorcycle shop featured on The Discovery Channel television series American Chopper.

Notable residents
Jan Rodriguez, interpreter for Dutch West India Company (in NYC), began working in OC & the surrounding area in 1612
 James Dolson, (Minisink area) settler 1600s, beaver-pelt trader. Built a fortified "block house" (at intersection of Dolson Ave and Rt 6)
 Sarah Wells, 1712, first female settler of European heritage in the interior of Orange County, at age 16. She and husband William Bull, built a stone house in the (now Town of Goshen) wilderness, and raised 12 children to adulthood. Died in 1796, aged 100 years, 15 days, with 335 descendants. Matriarch of the Bull Family
 William Bull, built Knox's Headquarters in New Windsor
 "Bette", emanumated slave 1700s, a key historical diarist for the area & time
 J. Hector St. John de Crèvecœur Chester Greycourt colonial farmer and agricultural writer Letters from an American Farmer
 Captain Isaac Belknap Sr. (1733-1815) - Newburgh sloop owner, mobilized his merchant fleet for military use during American Revolution; assigned to New Windsor - Fishkill ferry. Astn Quartermaster-general. 1 term as Town clerk.
 Thomas Young (American Revolutionary), organizer of Boston Tea Party, born New Windsor
 Henry Wisner, Orange County delegate to the First and Second Continental Congress, (but who did not sign the Declaration of Independence ) & a gunpowder producer 
 David Mathews, Loyalist Mayor of New York City under the British during the American Revolution, resided in Mathewsfield (now Blooming Grove)
 Noah Webster, Lexicographer, Webster's dictionary. Founded a private school, circa 1783, catering to wealthy parents in Goshen.
 George Washington, resided/stationed in Hasbrouck House in Newburgh, NY, from April 1782 until August 1783, during the waning days of the American Revolutionary War
 Benedict Arnold, revolutionary war general, hanged as "traitor"
 James Varick founder AME Zion Church & its 1st bishop, born Newburgh 
 William H. Seward, U.S. Secretary of State, under Lincoln, a 2 term federal Senator & 12th governor of NY, born & raised Florida, NY.
 Albert J. Myer, born Newburgh Sept 20, 1829. Surgeon & US Army general (1854–1869). Known as the father of the U.S. Army Signal Corps and the U.S. Weather Bureau.
 Elizabeth Marie Pope, author of The Sherwood Ring
 Stephen Crane, wrote part of The Red Badge of Courage in Port Jervis, ostensibly based on Orange Blossoms  battle at Chancellorsville 
 Zane Grey, practiced dentistry in Middletown, before his literary career
 Pierre Lorillard IV, tobacco magnate, founded Tuxedo Park in 1886
 Emily Post, author
 Tomás Estrada Palma, first President of Cuba, resided in a home on Route 32 in Central Valley.
 David Moffat, railroad developer, Washingtonville native
 Webb Horton, industrial tanner, early 20th Century, built Webb Horton House, namesake of Web Horton (Presbyterian) Church (b. 1918 Middletown) & E. Horton Hospital (1929-2011).
 Babe Ruth, vacationed at Glenmere Mansion & Greenwood Lake; "bar hopped" between Middletown, Circleville tavern (on Route 302) and Chester, after arriving in Middletown on the Erie RR line, and often spent time in Circleville Park, near the convent and lake.
 Solomon Townsend, industrialist and State Legislator
 Willie the Lion Smith, jazz "stride" pianist, born Goshen 1897
 Horace Pippin, Black artist/painter, raised & educated (in segregated schools) in Goshen
 Rose Thompson Hovick, mother of Gypsy Rose Lee and June Havoc
 Jolie Gabor, mother of Gabor sisters, resided Goshen, NY
 Geraldine Ferraro, 1984 U.S. vice-presidential candidate, U.S. Congresswoman
 Benjamin Gilman, US Congressman, 1973–2003, lifelong Middletown resident
 Louis B. Mills, 1st elected OC Executive (1970s). Secured $10 million Conservation land trust for Bannerman Castle in 1990s, from Gov. G. Pataki
 Harvey Burger, 1st Black OC Legislator
 Frederica Warner, Newburgh community activist, local founder of area Meals On Wheels
 Jimmy Sturr, lifelong resident of Florida, NY, 18x Grammy winning, polka musician
 John Bonacic, 30 year OC politician, State Assembly then Senate
 Audrey Carey, 1st elected Black, female mayor (1991 Newburgh) in NY State
 Michael Sussman, Harvard educated, civil rights attorney Show Me a Hero, Chester resident (1982–present)
 Joel Teitelbaum, Grand Rabbi of Satmar Hasidic community, spent final years and is buried in Kiryas Joel
 Aaron Teitelbaum, current Grand Rabbi of Kiryas Joel faction of Satmar Hasidic community.
 Martin Dempsey, US Army General & 18th chairman (Pentagon) Joint Chiefs of Staff 2011-2015, 1970 J.S. Burke graduate 
 Elise McAbee, US Army materials engineer
 General David Petraeus, 1970 Cornwall grad, retired four-star general of the U.S. Army. Former Director of the C.I.A. and commander of U.S. forces in Iraq (2007-2008) and Afghanistan (2011).
 William Moran, a retired United States Navy Admiral and Vice-Chief of Naval Operations (2016-2019).
 Nathaniel White, convicted serial killer
 Jay Westervelt, environmentalist, Village of Florida resident 
 Dr. Richard Hull , PhD, lifelong Warwick resident, NYU History professor & local historian
 James Skoufis, New York State Senator, former NY Assemblyman 
 James Emery, Warwick resident, since 2000s, jazz guitarist of String Trio of New York
 Andy Grammer, musician
 Brad Mehldau, jazz pianist
 Cyndi Lauper, 80s pop singer, spent summers in Tuxedo Park
 Saul Williams, musician, poet, actor and artist; was born and raised in Newburgh
 Vérité, musician
 Cage Kennylz, rapper, raised in Middletown
 Satella Waterstone, - author and composer
 James Patterson, prolific author
 Al Sarrantonio, author
 Spencer Tunick, photographer
 Emily DiDonato, fashion model, spokesmodel for Maybelline
 Mel Gibson, attended school in Washingtonville the year before his family moved to Australia in the 1960s.
 Tony Gilroy, writer, producer, director. Washingtonville grad
 Denzel Washington, actor, attended the now defunct Oakland Military Academy
 Whoopi Goldberg, Academy Award-winning actress, owns a Tuxedo Park home
 Robert DeNiro  Academy Award-winning actor, home in Tuxedo Park
 James Cromwell actor 1970s-2020s, political & environmental activist, Warwick resident since 2000s
 James Mangold, screenwriter, director.
 Armand Assante, Emmy Award winning actor
 Barry Bostwick, actor
 Johnny Brennan, - Salisbury Mills resident 1980s & early 90s, comedian/voice actor The Jerky Boys, Family Guy (voices Mort Goldman)
 Aaron Tveit, actor/singer, Broadway star, reared in Middletown
 Paul Teutul Sr., reality TV star, owner Orange County Choppers
 Paul Teutul Jr., custom motorcycle builder of Paul Jr. Designs
Shotsie Gorman, - American tattoo artist
 Frank Shorter, 1972 Olympic Marathon gold medalist
 Ed Banach 1984 Olympic wrestling gold medalist, Port Jervis native
 Lou Banach 1984 Olympic wrestling gold medalist, Port Jervis native
 Bill Bayno, 1980 J.S. Burke grad, 1990s champion UNLV college coach, astn. NBA coach 
 Stefanie Dolson WNBA player & 2021 Olympic 3x3 Gold medalist, Minisink High grad
 Nick Abruzzese of Slate Hill, 2022 US Olympic Hockey Team, Harvard grad, NHL Toronto Maple Leafs 2019 draftee
 Derek Jeter, New York Yankees captain, purchased Tiedemann Castle in Warwick
 Greg Anthony, former New York Knicks NBA player
 Tim Hummel, former MLB player Cincinnati Reds.
 Mike Avilés, MLB player, Kansas City Royals & Boston Red Sox, raised Middletown 
 Matt Morris, former all star pitcher St. Louis Cardinals and Pittsburgh Pirates, 1990s Valley Central graduate
 Joe Nathan, MLB player for the Minnesota Twins and Texas Rangers
 Dee Brown, former Major League Baseball and Nippon Professional Baseball player.
 Rob Bell, former MLB pitcher.
 Jason Motte, former MLB pitcher, closer for the 2011 Champion St. Louis Cardinals, Valley Central graduate
 Dave Telgheder, former MLB pitcher for the New York Mets and the Oakland Athletics.
 Brian Cashman, General Manager, New York Yankees
 Scott Pioli, NFL executive, former General Manager of the Kansas City Chiefs

See also

 Hudson Valley
 Orange County Youth Football League
 Wawayanda Patent, 1703 land grant
 Neversink Preserve
 Cuddebackville Dam
 List of counties in New York
 National Register of Historic Places listings in Orange County, New York

Notes

References

Further reading

External links

 Orange County, New York government
 Orange County tourism information
 Orange County, New York, Chamber of Commerce
 
 Early summary history of Orange County
 Hudson Valley Directory, listings pertaining to Orange County, New York

 
Poughkeepsie–Newburgh–Middletown metropolitan area
Counties in the New York metropolitan area
1698 establishments in the Province of New York
Populated places established in 1698
William III of England